Joaquín Carlos Diaz (5 July 1948 — 11 June 2015) was a Cuban chess International Master (IM) (1975).

Biography
From the late 1960s to the early 1990s Joaquín Carlos Diaz was one of the leading Cuban chess players. In 1976 in Biel he participated in the World Chess Championship Interzonal Tournament where ranked in 20th place. In 1987, in Camagüey Joaquín Carlos Diaz won Capablanca Memorial B tournament.

Joaquín Carlos Diaz played for Cuba in the Chess Olympiads:
 In 1968, at second reserve board in the 18th Chess Olympiad in Lugano (+1, =4, -2),
 In 1970, at first reserve board in the 19th Chess Olympiad in Siegen (+3, =1, -4),
 In 1972, at second reserve board in the 20th Chess Olympiad in Skopje (+5, =4, -1),
 In 1990, at second reserve board in the 29th Chess Olympiad in Novi Sad (+3, =2, -0).

Joaquín Carlos Diaz played for Cuba in the World Student Team Chess Championships:
 In 1966, at second reserve board in the 13th World Student Team Chess Championship in Örebro (+1, =3, -1),
 In 1969, at fourth board in the 16th World Student Team Chess Championship in Dresden (+1, =0, -2),
 In 1972, at first reserve board in the 19th World Student Team Chess Championship in Graz (+3, =3, -2),
 In 1974, at third board in the 20th World Student Team Chess Championship in Teesside (+7, =5, -0) and won individual bronze medal.

Joaquín Carlos Diaz played for Cuba in the Pan American Team Chess Championship:
 In 1987, at first reserve board in the 3rd Pan American Team Chess Championship in Junín (+5, =0, -1) and won team gold and individual silver medals,
 In 1991, at second reserve board in the 4th Pan American Team Chess Championship in Guarapuava (+1, =2, -0) and won team and individual gold medals.

In 1975, Joaquín Carlos Diaz was awarded the FIDE International Master (IM) title.

References

External links

Joaquín Carlos Diaz chess games at 365chess.com

1948 births
2015 deaths
Cuban chess players
Chess International Masters
Chess Olympiad competitors
20th-century chess players